This is a list of Iranian Iranian Super Cup winning football managers.

By year

The performance of the managers in the finals

By nationality

See also
 Iranian Super Cup
 List of Hazfi Cup winning managers
 List of Iranian Football League winning managers
 List of Iranian Futsal League winning managers

References

External links
Iran - List of Cup Finals since 2005, RSSSF.com

Super Cup
Iran Super Cup
managers